Maejap-gwa, also called maejak-gwa or tarae-gwa, is a ribbon-shaped hangwa (traditional Korean confection).

Preparation 
Wheat flour is kneaded with ginger juice and water, then rolled into a flat sheet. The sheet is then cut into small rectangles with three slits in the middle, and the end of each piece is put through the middle slit. The ribbons are then deep-fried, coated in honey or jocheong followed by chopped pine nuts.

Gallery

See also 
 Angel wings
 Yumil-gwa

References 

Hangwa
Doughnuts
Types of food